is a Japanese footballer.

Career statistics

Club

Notes

References

Living people
1999 births
Association football people from Saitama Prefecture
Japanese footballers
Japanese expatriate footballers
Association football defenders
Singapore Premier League players
Japan Soccer College players
Albirex Niigata Singapore FC players
Japanese expatriate sportspeople in Singapore
Expatriate footballers in Singapore